The British C-class submarines were the last class of petrol engined submarines of the Royal Navy and marked the end of the development of the  in the Royal Navy. Thirty-eight were constructed between 1905 and 1910 and they served through World War I.

With limited endurance and only a ten percent reserve of buoyancy over their surface displacement, they were poor surface vessels, but their spindle shaped hull made for good underwater performance compared to their contemporaries.

Service history
Three (C36, C37 and C38) had been sent to Hong Kong in 1911 and during the war the remainder were mainly used for coastal defence, based at the east coast ports of Leith, Harwich, Hartlepool, Grimsby and Dover, some operating with Q-ships which were decoying U-boats. The technique was for a trawler to tow the submarine and communicate with it by telephone. When a U-boat surfaced to attack the trawler with its deck gun, the British submarine would slip its tow and attempt to torpedo the U-boat.

, the first boat commissioned, was employed during the Zeebrugge raid on 23 April 1918. Packed with explosives it was blown up in an attempt to destroy a viaduct, for which her commander Lieutenant Richard Sandford was awarded the Victoria Cross.

Four operated in the Baltic Sea, based at Tallinn as part of the blockade of Germany trying to prevent the import of iron ore from Sweden. They were sent there in September 1915 via a tortuous route — towed around the North Cape to Arkhangelsk and taken by barge to Kronstadt.

C-class boats
38 C-class boats were built in total for the RN:

See also
CC-class submarine

Notes

References

External links

MaritimeQuest C Class Overview

C class